Nilus the Sandman is a Canadian part-animated and part-live-action television series that originally aired on The Family Channel from October 5, 1996 to October 25, 1998. The series was preceded by three Nilus the Sandman television specials broadcast between 1991 and 1994 on CTV. The series was produced by Cambium Film & Video Productions and Delaney & Friends Cartoon Productions, and distributed by The Family Channel and Western International Communications (WIC).

The show features the Sandman, named Nilus (voiced by Long John Baldry), who helps children and teenagers through their dreams while they are asleep, with the dream stories being animated. The scenes at the beginning and the end of each episode are shot in live action in Vancouver, British Columbia. The show has a total of 26 episodes which aired over two seasons.

The show later aired on A Channel in Alberta and MTN in Manitoba.

Synopsis
Nilus the Sandman helps children with day-to-day difficulties through helping them achieve happier dreams. While the children sleep he sneaks in and takes sand out of his pocket and flicks it into the air, which leads the children into their animated dream. The children are first surprised with their new animated avatar-self and start a journey discovering Nilus's friendly acquaintances – a talking clam and a camel – who help him during his mission.

Cast and characters
 Long John Baldry as Nilus the Sandman
 Ian James Corlett as Blue the Camel
 Cathy Weseluck as Pearl the Talking Clam
 Don Francks as The Boogie Man
 Britt Irvin as Amy
 Rhys Huber as Gus
 Dale Gillespie as Carrotio
 Micheal Fawkes as Frantic
 Marcus Hondro as Uncle George
 Simon Wong as Nick
 Kirk McMeekan as Coach
 Christopher Lovick as Various
 Stevie Vallance as Additional Voices
 Donny Osmond as Trendoid

Precursor television specials
Prior to the series' premiere, three Nilus the Sandman television specials were broadcast on CTV:

 Nilus the Sandman: The Boy Who Dreamed Christmas is a Christmas special which premiered on December 1, 1991.
 Nilus the Sandman: The First Day is a back-to-school special which premiered on September 3, 1993.
 Nilus the Sandman: Monsters in the Closet is a Halloween special which premiered on October 27, 1994.

Episodes
The series aired a total of 26 episodes over two seasons between 1996 and 1998.

Season 1 (1996–1997)

Season 2 (1998)

References

External links
 

1990s Canadian animated television series
1996 Canadian television series debuts
1998 Canadian television series endings
Canadian children's animated fantasy television series
Television shows about dreams
Sandman in television
Family Channel (Canadian TV network) original programming
Canadian television series with live action and animation
Television shows filmed in Vancouver
BBC children's television shows